Causeway End (NX 42047 59602) or Causwayend was a railway station on the Wigtownshire Railway branch line, from Newton Stewart to Whithorn, of the Portpatrick and Wigtownshire Joint Railway. It served a very rural area in Wigtownshire. The station closed in 1885, however it remained open to goods as Causeway End Siding.

History
The Portpatrick and Wigtownshire Joint Railway was formed from the amalgamation of two railway companies: The Portpatrick Railway and the Wigtownshire Railway, which got into financial difficulties; they merged and were taken over.

The single platformed station stood off the side of the Wigtown to Newton Stewart road with two entrances leading separately to either side of the single track. On the northern side was a single short siding running to loading dock.

The nearby overbridge was also known as Causway End Siding Bridge.

Mains of Penninghame Platform railway station stood close to the Clachan of Penninghame on the line towards Newton Stewart.

Other stations 
 Newton Stewart - junction
 Kirkinner
 Whauphill
 Sorbie
 Millisle
 Garlieston
 Broughton Skeog
 Whithorn

External links

References 

Notes

Sources
 
 Casserley, H.C.(1968). Britain's Joint Lines. Shepperton: Ian Allan. .

Disused railway stations in Dumfries and Galloway
Former Portpatrick and Wigtownshire Joint Railway stations
Railway stations in Great Britain opened in 1875
Railway stations in Great Britain closed in 1885
1875 establishments in Scotland
1964 disestablishments in Scotland